Maple Town, also known as , is a 1986 Japanese anime series created by Chifude Asakura and directed by Junichi Sato. The series, animated by Toei Animation, consists of 52 half-hour episodes, which aired on TV Asahi in Japan from January 19, 1986 to January 11, 1987. 

The show focuses on the adventures of Patty Rabbit, Bobby Bear and their families, in a small anthropomorphic city named Maple Town. The series was followed by a 50-episode sequel, New Maple Town Stories: Palm Town Chapter, which retained only Patty Rabbit (and her voice actor, Maya Okamoto) from both series, although Maple Town's citizens made cameos from time to time. To date, this has not had an official English release.

The show was dubbed into English and syndicated in the United States in 1987. The program spawned collectable figurines with changeable clothing, as well as houses, furniture and vehicles. Tonka was the US licensee and manufacturer.

VHS compilations of Maple Town appeared in North America, Europe and Japan during the late 1980s and early 1990s. As of 2013, official DVDs of the show had surfaced in Japan, Spain and Hungary, with no release plans announced for other territories.

Plot summary
Patty Hoperabbit, along with her family, arrives in Maple Town, a small town inhabited by friendly animals. However, in a train heist by the sly – if usually "endearingly unsuccessful" – thief, Wilde Wolf stole the mailbag from her father and escaped into the forest. Soon she followed after him to retrieve the mailbag. In the midst of getting the bag back from the thief, she befriends a boy of her age named Bobby Kumanoff who has the bag. After they escape from Wilde Wolf and outwit him, they deliver the mailbag safely to her father. Soon, the Rabbit Family settles in Maple Town as mail carriers and the bitter, yet sweet friendship of Patty and Bobby begins to blossom. At the same time they try to foil Wilde Wolf's plans.

The series's setting is Canada around the 1920s, while the setting of Palm Town Chapter is based on the West Coast of the United States around the 1980s.

Characters

Maple Town
The Rabbit Family – Patty, Rachel, Mr. Rabbit, Mrs. Rabbit, Ann and Mick Grandma and Grandpa Rabbit Couison Rabbit Roger Rabbit
The Bear Family – Bobby , Mr. Bear, Mrs. Bear, Kin, Kon and Kan Bonny
The Fox Family – Fanny, Mr. Fredrick Fox, Mrs. Florence Fox and Fred
The Cat Family – Mr. Cat and Mrs. Cat
The Dog Family – Danny, Dr. Dog, Mrs. Dog and Donny
The Squirrel Family – Suzie, Squire Squirrel, Mrs. Squirrel and Skippy
The Pig Family – Penny, Mr. Pig, Mrs. Pig and Polly
The Raccoon Family – Ruthie, Mr. Raccoon, Mrs. Raccoon and Roxie
The Mouse Family – Missie, Mr. Mouse, Mrs. Mouse and Marty
The Beaver Family – Bucky, Mr. Beaver, Mrs. Beaver and Bitsy
The Badger Family – Bert, Mr. Badger, Mrs. Badger and Betty
The Mole Family – Maggie, Mr. Mole, Mrs. Mole and Mikey
Kirby Cat
Mayor Dandy Lion
Miss Deer Andra Deer
Sheriff Barney Bulldog
Sheriff Barney Bulldog's Wife
Oscar Otter
Master Monkey
Dr. Goat
Wilde Wolf Gretel Wolf (aka Gretel)
Mr. Turtle
Kangaroos – Mr. Kangaroo, Mrs. Kangaroo, Coca Kangaroo
Mr. Walius

Palm Town
The Pike Family - Mrs. Jane, Mr. George, Alice
The Cocker Family - Rolley, Peter, Mr. Parabura, Mrs. Dahlia
The Terrier Family - Joey, Mr. Philip, Mrs. Florence
The White Family - Shiela, Mr. Roger
The Sheep Family - Mr. Charlie, Mrs. Mary, Sisi, Remi
Marina Dietrich
Gunter and Big Bro

US version:
VP of production: J. Edward Bergh
Supervising director: Robert V. Barron
Live action producer and director: Mary Jo Blue
Music: Haim Saban and Shuki Levy
Music coordination: Andrew Dimitroff
Video editing: Larry Porsche
Executive Producers: Haim Saban, Edd Gripes and Ray Volpe
Distribution: Saban/The Maltese Companies

Voice cast

English
Karen Hartman - Mrs. Maple (live-action segments, credited as Janice Adams)
Rebecca Forstadt – Patty Rabbit (as Reba West)
Barbara Goodson – Bobby Bear
Steve Kramer – Wilde Wolf
Maureen O'Connell – Fanny Fox
Barbara Goodson – Mikey Mole
Ted Layman – Mayor Lion

Episodes

Production
The series was produced by Toei Animation, Asatsu and Asahi Broadcasting, Maple Town was created by Chifude Asakura and directed by Junichi Sato. It served as one of the first projects for Kunihiko Ikuhara, who later joined the crew of Sailor Moon and Revolutionary Girl Utena. Ikuhara served as an assistant director and production manager for some of the show's later episodes.

United States
In October 1986, toy manufacturer Tonka acquired the rights for US$2.5–3 million and became its US licensee, launching a toy line and ad campaign early the following year. An English-dubbed version, airing in tandem with the toy promotion, starred actress Karen Hartman (credited as Janice Adams), known previously for her other children's TV role as Talkatoo Cockatoo on Zoobilee Zoo, as Mrs. Maple in its book-ending live-action segments. Mrs. Maple was the only human inhabitant of the title town in this version, and she offered each episode's moral lesson. The voice cast included Reba West as Patty Rabbit and Steve Kramer as Wilde Wolf.

The English version of Maple Town was produced by Saban Entertainment and The Maltese Companies, the latter of which also produced Spiral Zone, another syndicated series with Tonka, and the 1988 animated feature Pound Puppies and the Legend of Big Paw.

Broadcast history
The original Maple Town series aired on Sunday mornings in Japan on TV Asahi, from January 19, 1986 until January 11, 1987. Following its 52nd episode, its follow-up, aired in the same time slot.

In late 1986, Saban Entertainment and toy maker Tonka picked it up for the North American market. The latter invested US$7 million on television ads for the toy line. The first ten episodes of an English dub premiered in barter syndication the following year as a trial run, then sixteen more episodes premiered on Nickelodeon, where it aired until September 1, 1989. It then aired on The CBN Family Channel/The Family Channel from September 4, 1989 until September 13, 1990. A 65-episode run was originally announced, but only 39 ever reached US television.

In the late 1980s and early 1990s, European stations aired Maple Town in their various native languages. In Spain, TVE aired the program under the title La aldea del arce, starting in 1987. In France, the series was distributed by IDDH and broadcast from May 3, 1987 on FR3 in the program Amuse 3 under the name Les Petits Malins. It also aired on RTL Veronique in the Netherlands (as Avonturen in Maple Town); in Finland under the title Seikkailumetsä; in Sweden as Äventyrsskogen; and on Hungary's RTL Klub channel as Juharfalvi történetek.

As with Japan, several other countries aired both series of the Maple Town franchise. In Italy, Mediaset's Italia 1 broadcast both iterations of Maple Town during the late 1980s (under the titles Maple Town: Un nido di simpatia and Evviva Palm Town). The combined series aired as Les petits malins on FR3 in France at the time. On Nasza TV's showings in Poland, the show was known as Opowiesci z Klonowego Miasteczka and Opowiesci z Palmowego Miasteczka. In Hong Kong, Maple Town aired on the ATV network during 1991. Both shows also aired in Arabic speaking nations with the first series broadcast under أرنوبة ودبدوب (Arnoba Wa Dabdoob, Arnoba and Dabdood) and second airing under مدينة النخيل (Madina Al Nakheel, Palms Town).

Home video

During the 1990s, Toei Video released a ten-tape collection of Maple Town, each consisting of three episodes in their original airing order. In 2013, TC Entertainment released the original series in DVD box sets as part of Toei's Recollection Anime Library lineup. The first box set released on September 27, 2013 and the second set on October 30, 2013. Palm Town Chapter series was also released in the same label on November 27, 2013 for the first box set and on December 25, 2013 for the second box set.

Select episodes of Saban's US dub were released on VHS from late 1987 until 1990 by Family Home Entertainment and Tonka Home Video. Each tape consisted of two stories each, except for the first release, "Welcome to Maple Town". No less than eight English episodes were distributed in the UK by the now-defunct M.S.D. (Multiple Sound Distributors) label. Multicom Entertainment Group, who owns the US dub (by the way of their acquisition of The Kushner-Locke library in 2013), currently has no plans to release the entire series on home media or onto any streaming service, likely due to them having a hard time licensing the rights to use the cartoons from Toei.

In the Netherlands, CNR Video released a Dutch dub of the first two episodes in 1992. The stories were entitled "De Overval op de Trein" and "Voor het eerst naar de nieuwe school" in the Dutch language.

The entire original series was released on DVD in Spain by Divisa Home Video, in Japan by TC Entertainment, and Hungary's Fümoto released some episodes onto that format.

See also
Sylvanian Families, the toyline and animated TV series

References

External links
 Official Toei Maple Town Monogatari site
(in Japanese) Official Toei Palm Town site

 
 

1986 anime films
1986 anime television series debuts
1987 anime films
1987 anime television series debuts
1980s Nickelodeon original programming
1980s toys
Japanese children's animated adventure television series
Adventure anime and manga
Anthropomorphic animal characters
Animated television series about rabbits and hares
Animated television series about bears
Slice of life anime and manga
Television series by Saban Entertainment
Toei Animation television
TV Asahi original programming